Black Jack Branch is a tributary of Brown Creek in south-central North Carolina that drains Union County, North Carolina and Anson County, North Carolina.

Browns Creek rises near Sturdivants Crossroads, North Carolina and follows an easterly path to Brown Creek in the Wadesboro Triassic Basin.

See also
List of North Carolina rivers

References

Rivers of North Carolina
Rivers of Anson County, North Carolina
Rivers of Union County, North Carolina
Tributaries of the Pee Dee River